Quantwan Juaray Cosby (born December 23, 1982) is a former American football wide receiver who played in the National Football League (NFL). He was signed by the Cincinnati Bengals as an undrafted free agent in 2009. He played college football for the Texas Longhorns. He also played four years of professional baseball for the Anaheim Angels' organization.

Cosby has also been a member of the Denver Broncos, Indianapolis Colts, and the Jacksonville Jaguars.

References

External links 
 
 Cincinnati Bengals bio
 Jacksonville Jaguars bio
 

1982 births
Living people
Sportspeople from Texas
Players of American football from Texas
American football wide receivers
American football return specialists
Texas Longhorns football players
Arizona League Angels players
Provo Angels players
Cedar Rapids Kernels players
Cincinnati Bengals players
Denver Broncos players
Indianapolis Colts players
Jacksonville Jaguars players